South Salem Presbyterian Church Cemetery is a historic home located at South Salem, Westchester County, New York. The cemetery was established in the 18th century, perhaps as early as 1710. It has a total of 373 identified graves, ranging in date from 1739 to 1928.  Burials include veterans of the French and Indian War, Revolutionary War and War of 1812. It includes a number of notable 18th and 19th century grave markers.

It was listed on the National Register of Historic Places in 2014.

References

External links
 

Cemeteries on the National Register of Historic Places in New York (state)
1710 establishments in the Province of New York
Buildings and structures in Westchester County, New York
National Register of Historic Places in Westchester County, New York